Alexey Kuleshov (born 14 September 1987) is a Kazakhstani beach volleyball player. He competed at the 2012 Asian Beach Games in Haiyang, China.

References

External links
 
 

Living people
1987 births
Kazakhstani beach volleyball players
Beach volleyball players at the 2010 Asian Games
Beach volleyball players at the 2014 Asian Games
Beach volleyball players at the 2018 Asian Games
Asian Games competitors for Kazakhstan
21st-century Kazakhstani people